Marco Nasti (born 17 September 2003) is an Italian professional footballer who plays as a forward for  club Cosenza, on loan from AC Milan.

Club career
In July 2022, after graduating from the AC Milan youth academy, Nasti joined Serie B club Cosenza on a one-year loan.

Career statistics

Club

References

External links
 

Living people
2003 births
People from Pavia
Italian footballers
Association football forwards
Italy youth international footballers
A.C. Milan players
Cosenza Calcio players